Plongeur (French for "Diver") was a French submarine launched on 16 April 1863. She was the first submarine in the world to be propelled by mechanical (rather than human) power.

Captain Siméon Bourgeois, who made the plans, and naval constructor Charles Brun began working on the design in 1859 at Rochefort.

Design

In 1859 the Board of Construction called naval engineers for designs for a submarine and reviewed three, choosing that submitted by Siméon Bourgeois (later Admiral) and Charles Brun, naming the project Plongeur with the code name Q00.

The submarine used a compressed-air engine, propelled by stored compressed air powering a reciprocating engine. The air was contained in 23 tanks holding air at 12.5 bar (1.25 MPa, 180 psi), taking up a huge amount of space (153 m³/5,403 ft³), and requiring the submarine to be of unprecedented size. The engine had a power of 60 kW (80 hp), and could propel the submarine for 5 nmi (9 km), at a speed of 4 kn (7.2 km/h).

Compressed air was also used to empty its ballast tanks, which had a volume of 53 m³ (1,872 ft³). Ballast was 212 t (234 tons), including a security ballast of 34 t (37 tons).

The submarine was armed with a ram to break holes in the hull of enemy ships, and an electrically fired spar torpedo, fixed at the end of a pole, though later Admiral Bourgeois (who was, after 1871, chairman of the Commission on Submarine Defenses) opposed the use of torpedoes as the primary weapon in commerce warfare.

The submarine was 43 m (140 ft) long and 381 t (420 tons) in displacement.

A support ship, the Cachalot, followed her in order to resupply the compressed air necessary to her propulsion.

A small lifeboat (8 × 1.7 m; 26 × 5.6 ft) was provided for the escape of the 12-man complement.

Operational history

The submarine was commanded by Lieutenant de Vaisseau Marie-Joseph-Camille Doré, native of La Rochelle.

On 6 October 1863, Plongeur made her first trials by sailing down the river Charente, towards the harbour of the Cabane Carrée.

On 2 November 1863, Plongeur was towed towards Port de Barques where her first underwater trials were planned. Because of poor weather conditions, the submarine was eventually towed to La Pallice and then to the harbour of La Rochelle (Bassin à flot).

On 14 February 1864, during trials in the Bassin à flot, the engine raced due to an excessive admission of compressed air, and the submarine bumped into the quay. Trials were stopped.

On 18 February 1864, Plongeur was towed to La Pallice and dived to 9 m (30 ft).

Stability problems due to its length limited the submarine to dives to a maximum depth of 10 m (33 ft). The front of the submarine would tend to dive first, hitting the bottom, so that the submarine would glide forward. Pumps were installed to compensate for the tilt, but proved too slow to be effective. The installation of longitudinal rudders would have improved stability as later demonstrated by the Gymnote and Gustave Zédé submarines.

A model of Plongeur was displayed at the 1867 Exposition Universelle, where it was studied by Jules Verne, who used it as an inspiration and 3 years later published his novel Twenty Thousand Leagues Under the Sea.

After various experiments, the French Navy struck the ship on 2 February 1872.

Conversion

The submarine was reactivated as an automotive water tanker, equipped with a compound 2-cylinder steam engine of 90 kW (120 hp), on 1 January 1873. She was assigned to the harbour of Rochefort. She was equipped with a new engine in 1898, transferred from a torpedo boat (Torpilleur No 74).

In 1927, upon the closure of the arsenal at Rochefort, she was transferred to the Mediterranean at Toulon, where she was used to supply the 1st and 3rd squadrons with water.

She was decommissioned on 25 December 1935, and sold for 25,143 francs to a M. Negai on 26 May 1937.

See also

 Resurgam

Notes

Bibliography

External links

Submarine history

Submarines of the French Navy
Ships built in France
1863 ships
19th-century submarines
Jules Verne